Amelia Brodka (born 18 August 1989) is a Polish-American professional skateboarder, coach, and president of Exposure Skate Organization. A two-time European Park Skateboarding Champion, she qualified to compete in the inaugural women's park event at the Olympic Games.

Career 
Brodka was born and raised in Nowa Sarzyna, Poland and emigrated with her family to New Jersey in 1996. She began skateboarding when she was 12 years old and was further inspired to seriously pursue the sport after seeing women compete in skateboarding events at the 2002 X Games in Philadelphia. 

When she began competing in professional skateboarding events in 2009, she noticed a clear lack of opportunities and visibility for women and girls in the sport. Her senior thesis at the University of Southern California, Underexposed: A Women’s Skateboarding Documentary, aimed to shine a light on the gender disparities within the sport. The documentary went on to receive honorable mentions at several American film festivals. 

Brodka has ranked well in international vert, park, and bowl competitions for the past decade. Notable results include third place at the 2017 World Vert Championships, first place in the 2017 and 2018 European Park Championships, second place in the 2017 Australian Bowl Championships and first place at the 2020 Polish Park Skateboarding Championships. Her skateboarding has earned her a pro model skateboard on Arbor Skateboards, pro wheel on Speedlab Wheels, and one of skateboarding’s first-ever spots on Team Visa. Brodka is not only an athlete, she also advocates for gender equality through documentary film making, activism, and charitable work. 

In 2012, Brodka co-founded Exposure Skate Organization, commonly shortened to Exposure Skate or EXPOSURE®, a nonprofit organization dedicated to empowering women and girls through skateboarding. Exposure Skate seeks to create and expand opportunities for women in skateboarding within a structure of responsibility and service to the community. In ts first few years, EXPOSURE created the world’s largest women’s skateboarding event, called 'Exposure: A Women’s Benefit Event,' with over 230 competitors representing 23 countries vying for the biggest prize purse in the sport at the time. Proceeds from the annual event are donated to survivors of domestic violence. In 2016, EXPOSURE incorporated Skate Rising, an organization founded by Calli Kelsay with a mission to support girls' skating with service and self-empowerment components. Today, Skate Rising functions as the "youth empowerment program" of Exposure Skate and holds free monthly events for girls, aged 4 to 18. Skate Rising aims to promote empowerment through skateboarding and compassion through monthly service projects. Brodka’s firm belief in higher education for all inspired her to add a college scholarship program for female-identifying skateboarders to Exposure Skate’s programming in 2021.

Personal life 

Brodka holds a bachelor’s degree from the University of Southern California in communications and narrative studies. She lives in Vista, California with her husband, American skateboarder Alec Beck.

References

External links
 
 

Living people
1989 births
Female skateboarders
Olympic skateboarders of Poland
People from Leżajsk County
Polish skateboarders
Skateboarders at the 2020 Summer Olympics
University of Southern California alumni